You Can't Regret What You Don't Remember is the second solo album by Ben Moody. The album was released digitally November 11, 2011, through iTunes and Amazon.com via Moody's label, FNR Records.

Track listing

Personnel 

 Ben Moody — vocals, backing vocals, guitars, programming, sound design, orchestral and choral arrangements, drums, percussion, piano, keyboards, producer
 Jason C. Miller — vocals, backing vocals
 Marty O'Brien — bass
 Hana Pestle — backing vocals
 John Tempesta — drums, tribal percussion
 Zak St. John — drums
 Josh Newell — bass, vocals on "Chasing Yesterday," additional sound design
 Tobin Esperance — bass
 Mitch Allan — backing vocals
 Michael Tait — vocals, backing vocals
 David Hodges — backing vocals
 Dan Certa — additional programming, production
 Jared Scott — additional programming, production
 Jay Baumgardner — additional production
 Mixed and mastered by Dan Certa
 Engineered by Dan Certa, Jared Scott, Josh Newell, and Ben Moody, assisted by Dave Colvin, Sergio Chavez, and Casey Lewis.
 Recorded at NRG Recording / Coffin Case Warehouse / Sound Asleep Studios / Setback Studios
 Cover and booklet photographed and designed by Jasmine Safaeian

References

2011 albums
Ben Moody albums